Vittorio Sodano (Victor) is an Italian make-up artist. He was nominated for an Academy Award for Best Makeup for his work in Apocalypto (2006) and for Il divo (2010).
Born in Naples on 1 September 1974, at age 16, in London, he began his work as a make-up artist as a sculptor and  prosthodontist in a laboratory for film special effects.  In 1996 he made his début in cinema with the film Prima che il tramonto (Before the Sunset) by  Stefano Incerti, for which he won an award for make-up and special effects at the Locarno Film Festival.  With  considerable knowledge in the field of special effects make-up and application of prosthesis he began to assert himself in the Italian and European cinema, becoming a personal makeup artist of Italian's actresses Margherita Buy, Laura  Morante, Mariangela  Melato and Valeria Golino.  Vittorio Sodano has also  taught at several academies  of fine arts.

Awards and nominations
In 2007 Sodano got his first Oscar nomination for Apocalypto by Mel Gibson and a second one in 2010 for Il Divo by Paolo Sorrentino.  In 2009 he won the "David of Donatello" (a significant Italian award) for the same movie in the make-up artist category

 2007 - Oscar nomination for Apocalypto by Mel Gibson.
 2007 - Award Cinearti 'La chioma di Berenice' for Apocalypto by Mel Gibson.
 2008 - Award Cinearti 'La chioma di Berenice' for Il Divo by Paolo Sorrentino.
 2009 - Italian award 'David di Donatello' for Il Divo by Paolo Sorrentino.
 2010 - Oscar nomination for  Il Divo by Paolo Sorrentino.

Filmography

 1996 - Il fratello minore by Stefano Gigli.
 1999 - Prima del tramonto by Stefano Incerti.
 1999 - Le madri by Angelo Longoni (television film).
 2000 - Controvento by Peter del Monte.
 2001 - Tre mogli by Marco Risi.
 2001 - Le fate ignoranti by Ferzan Ozpetek.
 2002 - Incompreso by Enrico Oldoini (television film).
 2002 - Il più bel giorno della mia vita by Cristina Comencini.
 2003 - Ma che colpa abbiamo noi? by Carlo Verdone.
 2003 - Il Papa Buono by Ricky Tognazzi (television film).
 2003 - Ricordati di me by Gabriele Muccino.
 2004 - Part-time by Angelo Longoni.
 2004 - L'amore ritorna by Sergio Rubini.
 2004 - Il siero delle vanità by Alex Infascelli.
 2004 - Nerone by Paul Marcus (television film).
 2005 - L'Impero dei lupi by Chris Nahon.
 2005 - Casanova BY Lasse Hallstrom.
 2006 - Fade to black by Oliver Parker.
 2006 - Liscio by Claudio Antonini.
 2006 - Tre donne morali by Marcello Garofalo.
 2006 - Apocalypto by Mel Gibson.
 2006 - The black dahlia by Brian de Palma.
 2007 - Il Capo dei Capi by Alexis Cahill e Enzo Monteleone (TV).
 2007 - Il nascondiglio by Pupi Avati.
 2008 - Il Divo (film) by Paolo Sorrentino.
 2008 - Trilogia II: I skoni tou hronou di Theodoros Angelopoulos.
 2009 - Io Don Giovanni by Carlos Saura.
 2010 - Noi credevamo by Mario Martone.

References

External links

David di Donatello winners
Italian make-up artists
1974 births
Living people